There are places that have the name Hürben:

In Germany
Hürben (Krumbach), a former village which in 1902 became part of Krumbach, in the Günzburg district, Bavaria
A borough of Giengen an der Brenz, in the Heidenheim district, Baden-Württemberg